Skyline High School is a 9–12 public high school in Front Royal, Virginia, United States. It serves students residing in the western part of Warren County.

History 
The school was built as a response to the growing population of Warren County. The new building, which opened for classes in Fall of 2007, educates 60% of the county's population. This uneven division was chosen to accommodate the growth anticipated for the eastern part of the county which is closer to Washington, D.C. where population and enrollment will increase faster at Warren than at Skyline.

The former Warren County High School on Luray Avenue, which originally was the high school for all students in Warren County, is now Skyline Middle School, the primary feeder middle school for Skyline High.

Athletics 
The Skyline Hawks' colors are dark blue, dark green, and gold. In athletic and academic competition they are part of the Northwestern District of the Virginia High School League. Rivals include local high schools Warren County High School and Randolph-Macon Academy.

References

External links 
 

Public high schools in Virginia
Schools in Warren County, Virginia
Front Royal, Virginia